Mailholas is a commune in the Haute-Garonne department in southwestern France.

Geography
The commune is bordered by four other communes: Rieux-Volvestre to the northwest, Montesquieu-Volvestre to the south, Bax to the southeast, and finally by Latrape to the east.

Population

See also
Communes of the Haute-Garonne department

References

Communes of Haute-Garonne